Apisorn Phumchat (born March 22, 1994) is a Thai professional footballer who plays as a midfielder for Thai League 1 club Chiangrai United.

References

External links
 https://int.soccerway.com/players/pachara-poomchart/440469/

1994 births
Living people
Apisorn Phumchat
Apisorn Phumchat
Association football midfielders
Apisorn Phumchat
Apisorn Phumchat